The Battle of Mâcon (11 March 1814) saw a French division under Louis François Félix Musnier attack an Austrian corps led by Frederick Bianchi, Duke of Casalanza. The French enjoyed initial success but their numerical inferiority led to their defeat in this War of the Sixth Coalition clash.

Background
As Napoleon dueled with the main Allied armies of Karl Philipp, Prince of Schwarzenberg and Gebhard Leberecht von Blücher to the east of Paris, a subsidiary campaign was fought near Lyon to the southeast. In January 1814 the Austrians overran much territory, but in mid-February the reinforced French forces under Marshal Pierre Augereau mounted a counteroffensive. Alarmed at the threat to his supply lines, Schwarzenberg sent heavy reinforcements to Prince Hesse-Homburg.

Battle
Augereau ordered Musnier to attack Mâcon and found his enemies were much stronger than he had thought.

Aftermath
The Austrian army commander Prince Frederick of Hesse-Homburg soon pressed south toward Lyon.

Notes

References

Further reading

External links

Battles of the War of the Sixth Coalition
Battles of the Napoleonic Wars
Battles involving Austria
Battles involving France
Conflicts in 1814
March 1814 events
1814 in France